The 4 × 100 metre mixed medley relay competition at the 2022 World Aquatics Championships was held on 21 June 2022.

Records
Prior to the competition, the existing world and championship records were as follows.

Results

Heats
The heats were started at 10:13.

Final
The final was held at 19:52.

References

4 x 100 metre mixed medley relay